Oliver Robert Ocasek (November 2, 1925 – June 25, 1999) was an American politician of the Democratic party who served as President of the Ohio State Senate in the 1970s and 1980s. After the Democrats lost their majority in the Senate, Ocasek was replaced as party leader by Harry Meshel. In 1962 and 1968, Ocasek ran for a seat in the United States House of Representatives. He lost both times to Republican incumbent William H. Ayres. In 1986 he lost a Democratic primary for congress in the 14th district to Thomas C. Sawyer. Ocasek also served on the Ohio Board of Education from 1993 to 1998.

See also
 Election Results, U.S. Representative from Ohio, 14th District

References

1925 births
1999 deaths
People from Bedford, Ohio
School board members in Ohio
Democratic Party Ohio state senators
Presidents of the Ohio State Senate
20th-century American politicians